Following is the list of players to achieve the longest consecutive streaks of throwing touchdown passes in consecutive games in the National Football League.

Updated through 2021 season

Regular season

Official
An official streak is defined as a player passing for touchdown passes in consecutive games in which the player participated in a game. By this definition, a player's streak extends if the QB does not participate in any aspect of a given game due to injury or other reason. This definition is officially used by the NFL to track consecutive games with touchdown passes.

All-time consecutive games with at least one touchdown pass 

Drew Brees holds the NFL record, 54 games, for consecutive games with at least one touchdown pass. He set the record on October 7, 2012, when he surpassed the streak of 47 consecutive games by Johnny Unitas which had stood since December 11, 1960. Unitas had held the record for nearly 52 years after surpassing Cecil Isbell's streak of 23, which had been established as the record in 1942. Brees's record streak ended on November 29, 2012, against the Atlanta Falcons.

Bold denotes an active streak; minimum 23 consecutive regular season games.

All-time consecutive games with at least two touchdown passes 

Peyton Manning set the record for consecutive games with at least two touchdown passes with 15 in 2013, surpassing the record shared by several players including a streak of 13 he had in 2004. The previous record had since been tied by Tom Brady in 2007 and Aaron Rodgers in 2011. The record of 12 before that was set by Johnny Unitas in 1959 and tied by others before being surpassed by Manning. Don Meredith also had 13 consecutive games with at least two touchdown passes from 1965 through 1966. However, Meredith's streak was interrupted by not playing in the October 24, 1965 contest between the Dallas Cowboys and Green Bay Packers.

Bold denotes an active streak; minimum 10 consecutive regular season games.

All-time consecutive games with at least three touchdown passes 

Tom Brady set the record for consecutive games with at least three touchdown passes with 10 in 2007. The previous record of 8 was set by Peyton Manning in 2004 who had surpassed Marino's record of 7 established in 1987.

Bold denotes an active streak; minimum 5 consecutive regular season games.

All-time consecutive games with at least four touchdown passes 

Peyton Manning set the record for consecutive games with at least four touchdown passes with 5 in 2004. The previous record of 4 was set by Dan Marino in 1984.

Bold denotes an active streak; minimum 3 consecutive regular season games.

All-time consecutive games with at least five touchdown passes 
Daunte Culpepper was the first player in NFL history to have consecutive games with five touchdown passes. Tom Flores of the American Football League (which later merged with the NFL) also had consecutive games with at least five touchdown passes in 1963.

Bold denotes an active streak; minimum 2 consecutive regular season games.

All-time consecutive games with at least six touchdown passes 

Ben Roethlisberger established the record with at least six touchdown passes in two consecutive games in 2014.

Bold denotes an active streak; minimum 2 consecutive regular season games.

Uninterrupted 
An uninterrupted streak is defined as a player passing for touchdown passes in consecutive games uninterrupted for any reason including injury or other reason. By this definition, a player streak ends if the player does not participate in any aspect of a given game due to injury or other reason. This definition is not officially used by the NFL to track consecutive games with touchdown passes.

All-time consecutive uninterrupted games with at least one touchdown pass 

Tom Brady holds the record for most consecutive uninterrupted regular season games with at least one touchdown pass with 52, setting the record on December 2, 2012, surpassing Brees's 43, and ending at Cincinnati on October 6, 2013. Both players had surpassed Favre's record of 36, set in 2004.

Bold denotes an active streak; minimum 22 consecutive regular season games.

Note: Unitas' official streak was interrupted by an injury after 21 consecutive games with a touchdown pass. Brees' official streak of 54 games was interrupted by not playing week 17 of the 2009 regular season after 11 consecutive games with a touchdown pass. Brees other official streak of 20+ games with a touchdown pass was interrupted by an injury and did not play week 3 of the 2015 season after 38 consecutive games with a touchdown pass. Marino's official streak was interrupted by the 1987 NFL players' strike after 25 consecutive games with a touchdown pass. Manning's official streak was interrupted after sustaining a neck injury which caused him to miss the entire 2011 season after 7 consecutive games with a touchdown pass.

All-time consecutive uninterrupted games with at least two touchdown passes 
Bold denotes an active streak; minimum 10 consecutive regular season games.

All-time consecutive uninterrupted games with at least three touchdown passes
Bold denotes an active streak; minimum 5 consecutive regular season games.

All-time consecutive uninterrupted games with at least four touchdown passes 
Bold denotes an active streak; minimum 3 consecutive regular season games.

All-time consecutive uninterrupted games with at least five touchdown passes 
Bold denotes an active streak; minimum 2 consecutive regular season games.

All-time consecutive uninterrupted games with at least six touchdown passes 
Bold denotes an active streak; minimum 2 consecutive regular season games.

Home records

All-time consecutive regular season games with at least one touchdown pass at home 

Drew Brees holds the record for consecutive games with a touchdown pass at home. He has held the record since 2015 when he surpassed Tom Brady. Brady had surpassed the previous record in 2013 held by Dan Marino which he set in 1988. Prior to that, Johnny Unitas held the record.

Bold denotes an active streak; minimum 20 consecutive regular season games.

All-time consecutive regular season games with at least two touchdown passes at home 
Drew Brees' streak of 21 consecutive games with at least two touchdown passes at home is the longest of all time. Brett Favre held the previous record of 14 which he established in 1996. Favre had surpassed Jim Everett's home mark of 11 which he had set in 1990. Brees has held the record since 2012.

Bold denotes an active streak; minimum 10 consecutive regular season games.

All-time consecutive regular season games with at least three touchdown passes at home 
Bold denotes an active streak; minimum 5 consecutive regular season games.

All-time consecutive regular season games with at least four touchdown passes at home 
Bold denotes an active streak; minimum 3 consecutive regular season games.

All-time consecutive regular season games with at least five touchdown passes at home 
Bold denotes an active streak; minimum 2 consecutive regular season games.

All-time consecutive regular season games with at least six touchdown passes at home 
Bold denotes an active streak; minimum 2 consecutive regular season games.

Road records

All-time consecutive regular season games with at least one touchdown pass on the road 

Tony Romo's streak of 41 consecutive road games with at least one touchdown pass is the longest of all time which he set in 2014. He surpassed the previous record of 32 which had been held by Favre for 10 seasons. Johnny Unitas held the previous mark of 22 since 1960 until surpassed by Favre in 2003.

Bold denotes an active streak; minimum 20 consecutive regular season games.

All-time consecutive regular season games with at least two touchdown passes on the road 
Bold denotes an active streak; minimum 10 consecutive regular season games.

All-time consecutive regular season games with at least three touchdown passes on the road 
Bold denotes an active streak; minimum 5 consecutive regular season games.

All-time consecutive regular season games with at least four touchdown passes on the road 
Bold denotes an active streak; minimum 3 consecutive regular season games.

All-time consecutive regular season games with at least five touchdown passes on the road 
Bold denotes an active streak; minimum 2 consecutive regular season games.

Stadium records

All-time consecutive regular season games with at least one touchdown pass at a stadium 

Drew Brees (Mercedes-Benz Superdome) holds the record for consecutive games with a touchdown pass at a specific stadium venue. He has held the record since 2015 when he surpassed Tom Brady (Gillette Stadium). Brady had surpassed the previous record in 2013 held by Aaron Rodgers (Lambeau Field) which he set in 2012. Prior to that, Johnny Unitas (Memorial Stadium) held the record.

Bold denotes an active streak; minimum 20 consecutive regular season games.

All-time consecutive regular season games with at least two touchdown passes at a stadium 
Drew Brees' streak of 21 consecutive games with at least two touchdown passes at a specific stadium venue (Mercedes-Benz Superdome) is the longest of all time. Brett Favre held the previous record of 12 (Lambeau Field) which he established in 1996. The stadium record was tied by Kurt Warner (Trans World Dome) in 2000. Favre had surpassed Jim Everett's stadium mark of 11 (Anaheim Stadium) which he had set in 1990. Brees has held the record since 2012.

Bold denotes an active streak; minimum 10 consecutive regular season games.

All-time consecutive regular season games with at least three touchdown passes at a stadium 
Bold denotes an active streak; minimum 5 consecutive regular season games.

All-time consecutive regular season games with at least four touchdown passes at a stadium 
Bold denotes an active streak; minimum 3 consecutive regular season games.

All-time consecutive regular season games with at least five touchdown passes at a stadium 
Bold denotes an active streak; minimum 2 consecutive regular season games.

All-time consecutive regular season games with at least six touchdown passes at a stadium 
Bold denotes an active streak; minimum 2 consecutive regular season games.

Post season

Overall playoff games

All-time consecutive playoff games with at least one touchdown pass 

Brett Favre's streak of 20 consecutive games with at least one touchdown pass in the post-season is the longest of all-time. Dan Marino held the previous record of 13 which was surpassed by Favre in 2004.

Bold denotes an active streak; minimum 10 consecutive post season games.

All-time consecutive playoff games with at least two touchdown passes 
Bold denotes an active streak; minimum 5 consecutive post season games.

All-time consecutive playoff games with at least three touchdown passes 

Bold denotes an active streak; minimum 3 consecutive post season games.

All-time consecutive playoff games with at least four touchdown passes 
Bold denotes an active streak; minimum 2 consecutive post season games.

Home playoff games

All-time consecutive home playoff games with at least one touchdown pass 

Bold denotes an active streak; minimum 10 consecutive post season games.

All-time consecutive home playoff games with at least two touchdown passes 
Bold denotes an active streak; minimum 5 consecutive post season games.

All-time consecutive home playoff games with at least three touchdown passes 
Bold denotes an active streak; minimum 3 consecutive post season games.

All-time consecutive home playoff games with at least four touchdown passes 
Bold denotes an active streak; minimum 2 consecutive post season games.

All-time consecutive home playoff games with at least five touchdown passes 
Bold denotes an active streak; minimum 2 consecutive post season games.

Road playoff games

All-time consecutive road playoff games with at least one touchdown pass 
Bold denotes an active streak; minimum 10 consecutive post season games.

All-time consecutive road playoff games with at least two touchdown passes 
Bold denotes an active streak; minimum 5 consecutive post season games.

All-time consecutive road playoff games with at least three touchdown passes 
Bold denotes an active streak; minimum 3 consecutive post season games.

Combined regular season/post season

All-time consecutive combined uninterrupted games with at least one touchdown pass 

Drew Brees holds the record for consecutive uninterrupted games with a touchdown pass including playoffs with 49; the previous record of 39 was held by Brett Favre.

Bold denotes an active streak; minimum 30 consecutive combined regular plus playoff games.

All-time consecutive combined uninterrupted games with at least two touchdown passes 
Bold denotes an active streak; minimum 13 consecutive combined regular plus playoff games.

All-time consecutive combined uninterrupted games with at least three touchdown passes 
Bold denotes an active streak; minimum 8 consecutive combined regular plus playoff games.

All-time consecutive combined uninterrupted games with at least four touchdown passes 
Bold denotes an active streak; minimum 4 consecutive combined regular plus playoff games.

All-time consecutive combined uninterrupted games with at least five touchdown passes 
Bold denotes an active streak; minimum 2 consecutive combined regular plus playoff games.

All-time consecutive combined uninterrupted games with at least six touchdown passes 
Bold denotes an active streak; minimum 2 consecutive combined regular plus playoff games.

See also 
 List of National Football League records (individual)#Passing touchdowns
 List of most consecutive starts and games played by National Football League players
 List of most consecutive starts by a National Football League quarterback
 List of most wins by a National Football League starting quarterback

References 

Touchdown passes, Most consecutive games
National Football League lists